The canton of Vauvert is an administrative division of the Gard department, southern France. Its borders were modified at the French canton reorganisation which came into effect in March 2015. Its seat is in Vauvert.

It consists of the following communes:
 
Aigues-Vives
Aubord
Beauvoisin
Bernis
Codognan
Mus
Uchaud
Vauvert
Vergèze
Vestric-et-Candiac

References

Cantons of Gard